Rodney Rice (born June 18, 1966) is a former American football defensive back. He played for the New England Patriots in 1989 and for the Tampa Bay Buccaneers in 1990.

References

1966 births
Living people
American football defensive backs
BYU Cougars football players
New England Patriots players
Tampa Bay Buccaneers players